Kuchai Lama is a suburb in Seputeh constituency in south-western Kuala Lumpur, Malaysia, located along the Old Klang Road.

This suburb is situated 8 km away from Kuala Lumpur City Centre. It is adjacent to Taman Desa, Pantai Dalam, Taman OUG and Salak South. Ajinomoto's Malaysian plant is located here.

Strategic location includes being at the intersection of many highways and expressways, including the KL-Seremban Highway, New Pantai Expressway, Sungei Besi Highway, KESAS Expressway and KL-Putrajaya Dedicated Highway.

Townships
 Taman Goodwood
 Taman Lian Hoe
 Taman Continental
 Taman Pagar Ruyong
 Taman Kuchai Jaya
 Kuchai Entrepreneurs Park (Kuchai Lama Town)
 Happy Garden (seldom referred as Taman Gembira)
 Taman Salak South
 Taman Naga Emas

Public transportation

Railway
 KTM Pantai Dalam is the closest station. The MRT SSP Line will have a stop here in 2022.

Bus
rapidKL buses T582 and T583.

Suburbs in Kuala Lumpur